Werauhia marnier-lapostollei is a plant species in the genus Werauhia. This species is native to Costa Rica.

References

marnier-lapostollei
Flora of Costa Rica